Cupsogue Beach County Park is a  park at the eastern end of Fire Island and the western end of Westhampton Island, known locally as Dune Road, one of Long Island's easternmost barrier islands. The park is surrounded by the Atlantic Ocean, Moriches Inlet and Moriches Bay.

Location
Though the park exists on both sides of the Moriches Inlet and is located entirely within the Town of Brookhaven, it is only accessible from the western terminus of Dune Road, which itself is in the Town of Southampton. The closest bridge to the park is for Jessup Lane in the village of Westhampton Beach between Moriches Bay and Moneybogue Bay. The park's eastern border is the Brookhaven/Southampton town line and the village of West Hampton Dunes.

Park description
This  barrier beach park offers lifeguard-supervised swimming, sunbathing, fishing, scuba diving, and special events. A food concession, restrooms, first aid center (staffed by an EMT during the summer months), showers and changing rooms are all situated at Cupsogue's pavilion. Camping and recreational vehicles are permitted along the access road running parallel to the outer beach.

Most facilities at the park can be found on the east side of Moriches Inlet. The segment of the park on the west side is preserved land that is divided by a strip of town parkland separating Cupsogue from Smith Point County Park.

This park is home to many piping plovers, a federally protected shorebird.

History
Dated from the 1690s, the Native American word Cupsogue means "a closed inlet". The park's land was entirely part of Fire Island until a 1931 Nor'easter created the Moriches Inlet, which enlarged between 1933 and 1938. The park was acquired by the Suffolk County Parks Department in the 1950s, and by the 1970s Cupsogue Beach County Park was given a pavilion and boardwalk.

A breach connecting the Atlantic Ocean and Great South Bay occurred on the east end of the park as a result of high tides during Hurricane Sandy in 2012.

In 2014, The Beach Hut at Cupsogue Beach was destroyed in a large blaze that engulfed the entire shack.

References

External links
Cupsogue Beach County Park - official site

Beaches of Suffolk County, New York
Southampton (town), New York
Parks in Suffolk County, New York
Brookhaven, New York